Mustang Island State Park is a state park located south of the city of Port Aransas, Texas, United States on the coast of the Gulf of Mexico that covers  and has a  beachfront. The land was acquired from private owners in 1972 and opened to the public in 1979. The island takes its name from wild mustangs that roamed the island which eventually succumbed to ranching in the late 1800s.

History
Mustang Island is believed to have formed around 2,500 years ago as sand and other sediments built up sandbars.

The earliest known inhabitants of Mustang Island were Karankawa Indians. The Karankawas were a hunter-gatherer people, and lived off the shellfish and mussels they caught in the Gulf.

The first known historical record of Mustang Island was made by Alonso Álvarez de Pineda, a Spanish explorer who charted the island in 1519. A fort was built on Mustang Island during the Mexican–American War, 1846–48, to guard the entrance to Aransas Bay. Records show that an Englishman named Robert A. Mercer and one H. L. Kinney both ran cattle on Mustang Island in the 1850s. During the Civil War, the coastal area was blockaded by the Union Navy, but the conflict ended with no major battles occurring in the area.

The area was later bought by Sam Wilson Jr., husband of the eccentric Ada Wilson. With the help of Sissy Farenthold, the state of Texas bought the land and developed the park.

Features

Natural
Mustang Island is a coastal barrier island dependent upon sand dunes for protection from storms and the sea. The vegetation holding the dunes in place are drought-resistant species such as sea oats, and soilbind morning glory. The island's fauna is dominated by rodents such as pocket gophers, marsh rice rats and cotton rats. Other small mammals include opossums, raccoons, striped skunks, jackrabbits, cottontail rabbits, armadillos and coyotes. Large numbers of waterfowl and shorebirds are common, as well as several species of hawks and a large variety of songbirds, most of which are migratory.

Recreational
The park offers camping among 48 water and electric sites and 300 drive-up primitive sites, picnicking, kayaking with access to the  Mustang Island Paddling Trail, fishing, swimming, hiking mountain biking, sunbathing, and birdwatching with over 400 bird species identified here.

References

External links

Texas Parks and Wildlife: Mustang Island State Park
Home movie of the Baylor family visiting Mustang Island on the Texas Archive of the Moving Image

State parks of Texas
Protected areas of Nueces County, Texas